FDR, or Franklin D. Roosevelt (1882–1945), was president of the United States from 1933 to 1945.

FDR may also refer to:

Entertainment
 FDR (video game), a 1996 computer game
 Fan Death Records, an American record label
 Franklin Delano Romanowski, a character from the television show Seinfeld
 Freedomain Radio, a podcast

Politics
 Foundation for Democratic Reforms, an Indian think tank
  (Revolutionary Democratic Front), a political organization in El Salvador
  (People's Democratic Front (Indonesia)), a defunct political party in Indonesia 
 Front pour la démocratie et la république (Front for Democracy and the Republic), a political coalition in Mali

Technology
 False discovery rate, in statistics
 FDR (software), for checking formal models
 Firearm discharge residue, or gunshot residue
 Flight data recorder of an aircraft
 A signaling rate used in InfiniBand
 Electrical frequency disturbance recorder, an FNET sensor
 Full depth recycling, repaving by recycling material

Other uses
 FDR Drive, a road in New York City
 FDR, stage name of Felix McTeigue, American musician
 Fluid Dynamics Research, a scholarly journal
 Fonciere des Regions, a French holding company
 FDR, IATA code for Frederick Regional Airport in Oklahoma

See also
 Franklin Delano Roosevelt Jr. or FDR Jr. (1914–1988), American politician, son of Franklin D. Roosevelt
 Franklin Delano Roosevelt III or FDR III (born 1938), American economist, son of Franklin D. Roosevelt Jr